The Nikon 1 J4 is an entry-level digital mirrorless exchangeable lens camera announced by Nikon on April 10, 2014.

See also
 Nikon 1 series
 Nikon 1-mount

References
http://www.dpreview.com/products/nikon/slrs/nikon_j4/specifications

Nikon MILC cameras
J4
Cameras introduced in 2014